Perry Local School District is the name of two school districts in Ohio:
Perry Local School District (Stark County) in Stark County, sometimes referred to as "Massillon Perry"
Perry Local School District (Lake County) in Lake County